Tōkyō no hito sayōnara (東京の人さようなら ) is a 1956 Japanese film directed by Ishirō Honda. The film is about young lovers trying to listen to their heart despite their parent's interjecting.

Production
The film is the first of three short feature films starring the enka singer Chiyoko Shimakura. These films were made in conjunction with Ryo Takei's company Sogei Pro. According to Honda, the film was made at a time when Toho was "trying everything out" which led to building a film around Chiyoko Shimakura. Honda commented later on the era saying he "tried [his] best at whatever kind of thing would come my way instead of rejecting something that might not have been for me."

Release
Tōkyō no hito sayōnara was distributed theatrically by Toho on 28 June 1956.

References

Bibliography

External links
JMDB

1956 films
Japanese drama films
Films directed by Ishirō Honda
1950s Japanese films
1956 drama films
Japanese black-and-white films